Colonel March of Scotland Yard is a British television series consisting of a single season of 26 episodes first broadcast in the United States from Dec. 1954 to Spring of 1955. The series premiered on British television in September 1955. It is based on author John Dickson Carr's (aka Carter Dickson) fictional detective Colonel March from his book The Department of Queer Complaints (1940). Carr was a mystery author who specialised in locked-room whodunnits and other 'impossible' crimes: murder mysteries that seemed to defy possibility. The stories of the television series followed in the same vein with Detective March solving cases that baffle Scotland Yard and the British police. The department itself is sometimes referred to as "D3". Boris Karloff starred as Colonel March.

Production
The series was made at Southall Studios in Middlesex, England (and, later, Nettlefold Studios in Walton-on-Thames, England) and was produced by Fountain Films for ITV. In July 1952, Karloff and his wife Evelyn sailed to England, where Karloff filmed three different pilot episodes to be shown to TV executives. While awaiting a decision on more episodes, the three pilots were combined into a feature film called Colonel March Investigates (1953). In 1953, Karloff returned to England to film 23 more episodes, making a total of 26.

The Colonel March TV series premiered first in the United States from Dec. 1954 to Spring of 1955, with a total of 26 episodes. It first premiered in England in 1955 on Associated Television (ITV London, weekends), broadcast on 26 consecutive Saturday evenings from 24 September 1955 until 17 March 1956.

The show starred Boris Karloff as the urbane, tweed-wearing, eye-patched sleuth. No reason was ever given for the wearing of the patch. Other regular actors included Ewan Roberts as Inspector Ames of Scotland Yard and Eric Pohlmann as Inspector Goron of the Paris Sûreté. (In the episode "The Second Mona Lisa", Pohlmann played a Middle Eastern character called The Emir.) Roberts' Scottish accent grows stronger as the series progresses, from plummy English in the first dozen episodes to full-on Scottish burr for the second dozen.

The opening title sequence showed Colonel March taking off his coat in his office and writing the title of each episode in a book. This then dissolves to an image of an object from within the following story, what Alfred Hitchcock would call a MacGuffin, a fairly unimportant plot device that starts the story rolling and/or keeps it moving along. Often it's a murder weapon or an item of clothing. Sometimes its relevance is a mystery until it is revealed later in the episode. Other episodes, such as in "The Headless Hat", show the item that the episode is named after.

The episode "The Talking Head" uses the complete version of the original theme tune during the end credits. It was usually truncated and faded up whilst some way through. The show's slightly mysterious and threatening theme tune was changed for the episodes "Error at Daybreak" and "The Silver Curtain" to a piece of jaunty, faster-paced music that had originally been used in previous episodes to accompany shots of a busy city.

Other guest actors in the series include Alan Wheatley, Christopher Lee, Patrick Barr, Hugh Griffith, Marne Maitland (twice), Joan Sims, Anthony Newley, Patricia Owens, George Coulouris, Anton Diffring, Martin Benson, Zena Marshall, Mary Parker Henryetta Edwards, and Robert Brown. The episode "Death and the Other Monkey" features a small acting part by future film director John Schlesinger as a Dutch ship's captain. The episode "Error at Daybreak" features a performance from the then 10-year-old actor Richard O'Sullivan who later went on to star in Man About the House, Robin's Nest and several other ITV series.

Critical reception
In Britain, the series was initially evaluated in the larger context of the programming of the newly launched ITV: "If there were only something of signifiant badness, then one could at least take a hatchet to it. But who could take a hatchet to Wilson, Keppel, and Betty, stars of Saturday night's variety programme, or to the adventures of 'Colonel March of Scotland Yard', the intellectual content of which is the nearest thing to a hole I have ever seen?"

Current availability

As of July 2016, all 26 episodes were available for streaming on the UK Amazon Prime platform. As of September 2016, the series was being screened on UK television channels Talking Pictures TV and London Live.  As of February 2018, the U.S. TV channel Decades occasionally airs this at various times.

As of May 2018, the series airs nightly on The Classic TV channel (515) on Pluto TV.

List of episodes

Home media
Eight episodes (only) of the series have been released to home video by Alpha Video.

The region 2 DVD release of the 1970 Karloff film Cauldron of Blood (aka Blind Man's Bluff) includes the episode "The Silver Curtain" as an extra.

All 26 episodes are available to stream on Amazon Prime and on Hoopla (digital media service)

References

External links
 

ITV mystery shows
1950s British drama television series
1955 British television series debuts
1956 British television series endings
1950s British crime television series
Detective television series